National Housing Bank (NHB), is the apex regulatory body for overall regulation and licensing of housing finance companies in India. It is under the jurisdiction of Ministry of Finance , Government of India. It was set up on 9 July 1988 under the National Housing Bank Act, 1987. NHB is the apex financial institution for housing. NHB has been established with an objective to operate as a principal agency to promote housing finance institutions both at local and regional levels and to provide financial and other support incidental to such institutions and for matters connected therewith. The Finance Act, 2019 has amended the National Housing Bank Act, 1987. The amendment confers the powers of regulation of Housing Finance Companies (HFCs) to the Reserve Bank of India.

NHB registers and supervises Housing Finance Companies (HFCs), keeps surveillance through On-site & Off-site Mechanisms and co-ordinates with other Regulators.

Established 
The Sub-Group on Housing Finance for the Seventh Five Year Plan (1985–90) identified the non-availability of long-term finance to individual households on any significant scale as a major lacuna impeding progress of the housing sector and recommended the setting up of a national level institution.

The Committee of Secretaries considered' the recommendation and set up the High Level Group under the Chairmanship of Dr. C. Rangarajan, the then Deputy Governor, RBI to examine the proposal and recommended the setting up of National Housing Bank as an autonomous housing finance institution. The recommendations of the High Level Group were accepted by the Government of India.

The Hon’ble Prime Minister of India, while presenting the Union Budget for 1987–88 on 28 February 1987 announced the decision to establish the National Housing Bank (NHB) as an apex level institution for housing finance. Following that, the National Housing Bank Bill (53 of 1987) providing the legislative framework for the establishment of NHB was passed by Parliament in the winter session of 1987 and with the assent of the Hon’ble President of India on 23 December 1987, became an Act of Parliament.

The National Housing Policy, 1988 envisaged the setting up of NHB as the Apex level institution for housing.

In pursuance of the above, NHB was set up on 9 July 1988 under the National Housing Bank Act, 1987. NHB is wholly owned by Govt. of India as after 24 April 2019 notification of RBI, which contributed the entire paid-up capital. The general superintendence, direction and management of the affairs and business of NHB vest, under the Act, in a Board of Directors. The Head office of NHB is at New Delhi.

Preamble 
The Preamble of the National Housing Bank Act, 1987 describes the basic functions of the NHB as –

"... to operate as a principal agency to promote housing finance institutions both at local and regional levels and to provide financial and other support to such institutions and for matters connected therewith or incidental thereto ..."

Vision 
"Promoting inclusive expansion with stability in housing finance market"

Mission 
"To harness and promote the market potentials to serve the housing needs of all segments of the population with the focus on low and moderate income housing "

Objectives 
NHB has been established to achieve, inter-Alia, the following objectives –
 To promote a sound, healthy, viable and cost effective housing finance system to cater to all segments of the population and to integrate the housing finance system with the overall financial system.
 To promote a network of dedicated housing finance institutions to adequately serve various regions and different income groups.
 To augment resources for the sector and channelise them for housing.
 To make housing credit more affordable.
 To regulate the activities of housing finance companies based on regulatory and supervisory authority derived under the Act.
 To encourage augmentation of supply of buildable land and also building materials for housing and to upgrade the housing stock in the country.
 To encourage public agencies to emerge as facilitators and suppliers of serviced land, for housing.
 Providing, establishing, supporting or aiding the housing 
Finance institutions.

Board of directors
 Shri Sarada Kumar Hota, Managing Director, National Housing Bank
 Shri Satish K. Marathe, Central Board of Director, Reserve Bank of India
 Shri Yamal Vyas, Director, National Housing Bank
 Shri Kuldip Narayan, Joint Secretary, Ministry of Housing & Urban Affairs
 Shri Lalit Kumar Chandel, Economic Advisor, Department of Financial Services, Ministry of Finance
 Shri Gaya Prasad, Deputy Director General (Rural Housing), Joint Secretary (JS) level, Ministry of Rural Development 
 Shri Manoj Kumar Meena, Secretary, Housing Department, Government of Karnataka
 Smt Seema Rekha Bhuyan, IAS, Secretary ( Personnel, Indigenous, Tribal Faith & Culture Department), Assam State Secretariat

Notes

External links 
 Official site
National Housing Bank (NHB) Recruitment 2021
 Annual reports

Organisations based in Delhi
Housing finance companies of India
Regulatory agencies of India
Government of India
1988 establishments in Delhi
Government agencies established in 1988